Barrhead-Westlock was a provincial electoral district in Alberta, Canada mandated to return a single member to the Legislative Assembly of Alberta using the first-past-the-post method of voting from 1993 to 2004.

History

Boundary history
Barrhead-Westlock was created from Barrhead, Westlock-Sturgeon and a small portion of Athabasca-Lac La Biche in 1993. Its largest communities were its namesake towns Barrhead and Westlock, as well as the town of Swan Hills. Its boundaries remained unchanged in the redistribution that took effect in 1997.

The riding was replaced by Barrhead-Morinville-Westlock in the 2003 electoral boundary re-distribution, which covered the entire area of Barrhead-Westlock and a small portion of Redwater.

Representation history

Barrhead-Westlock's only MLA was Ken Kowalski, who had already served as the Progressive Conservative member for Barrhead since 1979.

After the 1997 election, Kowalski became the 11th Speaker of the Legislative Assembly.

When Barrhead-Westlock was abolished for the 2004 election, Kowalski continued his political career, serving two more terms in the new riding of Barrhead-Morinville-Westlock as MLA and Speaker of the Assembly.

Election results

1993 general election

1997 general election

2001 general election

See also
List of Alberta provincial electoral districts

References

Further reading

External links
Elections Alberta
The Legislative Assembly of Alberta

Former provincial electoral districts of Alberta